Photios is a Greek name, latinized as Photius.

It commonly refers to Saint Photios I of Constantinople (c. 810/820 – 893), an Eastern Orthodox scholar and Patriarch of Constantinople.

A modern diminutive variant is Fotis.

People with the name Photios or variants

 Saint Photius the Martyr, a Christian martyr under Emperor Diocletian (died 305)
 Photios (Emirate of Crete) (fl. 870s), Byzantine renegade and admiral of the Emirate of Crete
 Photius, Metropolitan of Moscow (died 1431)
 Photius Fisk, a chaplain in the U.S. Navy (1807–1890)
 Charles-Marie-Photius Maurras, a French author, politician, poet, and critic who was a founder of Action Française (1868-1952)
 Patriarch Photius II of Constantinople (1874–1935)
 Patriarch Photius of Alexandria (died 1925)
 Photios of Korytsa (1862–1906), Greek Orthodox metropolitan bishop of Korçë
 Photis Kontoglou (1895–1965), Greek writer and iconographer

People with the name Fotis

 Fotis Kafatos (1940–2017), Greek biologist
 Fotis Kouvelis (born 1948), Greek lawyer and politician
 Fotios Vasilopoulos (born 1986), Greek basketball player